Ignacio Hernando de Larramendi y Montiano (1921–2001) was a Spanish entrepreneur, Carlist militant and author. Larramendi was as a longtime head of MAPFRE and is often counted among 100 most influential Spanish businessmen of the 20th century. He is recognized as sponsor and organizer of multifold initiatives related to Hispanic culture, mostly in Latin America. He briefly rose to Carlist executive, but is better known as engaged in promotion of Traditionalist heritage.

Family and youth

Hernando's ancestors on both sides were members of Basque nobility. His paternal grandfather, Mariano Hernando, was an art merchant, but is best known for the Trocadero bullring in Paris. Ignacio's father, Luis Hernando de Larramendi (1882–1957), was a lawyer in Madrid. A Carlist activist and unsuccessful candidate to the Cortes, in 1919–1921 he briefly grew to be a political leader of Jaimismo, in the mid-1930s again making it to the party executive and remaining on good terms with the claimant. Having always displayed a penchant for social issues he passed it later on to his sons; during the Civil War he refused to comply with the Unification Decree and withdrew from politics. His wife and Ignacio's mother, María de Montiano y Uriarte (1886–1976), counted Manuel de Montiano and Agustin de Montiano among her ancestors; the closer ones were less fortunate and partially lived selling off family estates; her father was a Bilbao physician. Considered the most handsome girl in the city, she was also fanatically Basque.

The couple lived in Madrid at calle Velázquez. They had 9 children, all brought up in fervently Catholic ambience. As Ignacio was initially educated at home, he entered Colegio de Nuestra Señora de Pilar as late as in 1932; he had not completed the curriculum before the Civil War broke out. At that time the family was at their usual summer holiday location in San Sebastián; Luis Larramendi escaped to the Nationalist zone and returned few weeks later, when the Carlist Requeté seized the city. Ignacio continued his schooling in the Marianist Colegio de Santa María until obtaining bachillerato in 1937; he then enlisted to an auxiliary Requeté formation in Fuenterrabía, serving as a prison guard. In July 1938 together with his brother and with hesitant consent of their parents he was accepted at 2. Compaña de Radio Requeté, but following a conflict with commander of the unit, in early 1939 he moved to Compañia de Tolosa in the Gipuzkoan Tercio San Miguel. With no major combat the battalion advanced through Catalonia to the French frontier, in late winter shuttled to Extremadura and, again after low-intensity skirmishes, reached the province of Toledo at the moment of final Nationalist victory.

In 1939 Larramendi commenced studying law in Madrid, graduating in 1941; though initially he intended to be a lawyer, in 1944 he was employed at Dirección General de Seguros, a state insurance regulatory body. Since 1940 he was dating Lourdes Martínez Gutiérrez (1924–2015), granddaughter to general Alfredo Gutiérrez Chaume; her father, "funcionario de Hacienda", died early. The couple married in 1950 and had 9 children, born between 1951 and 1965. The best known of them, Ramón Hernando de Larramendi, is widely recognized in Spain as a polar explorer. Luis succeeded his father in business and in politics, rising to high positions within the Carlist structures and animating a number of Traditionalist activities. Miguel is known as professor of Arabic studies in Madrid and Margarita as a poet and scholar in linguistics.

Early politics: from leaflet dropper to party executive

Already as a 10-year-old Ignacio was engaged in politics, in 1931 distributing Carlist electoral leaflets of his father; apart from the Requeté episode, during the Civil War he engaged in a Carlist student organization Agrupación Escolar Tradicionalista, mocking himself as president of its Madrid branch on exile. Having returned to the capital he indeed engaged in local AET organization and emerged as one of its most active leaders. Together with a group of similarly-minded peers, best known of them Rafael Gambra and Francisco Elías de Tejada, he staged minor and semi-private anti-Francoist demonstrations, at one point in 1942 having been detained and placed under security supervision. Their most notable activity was Academia Vázquez de Mella, a Carlist-flavored private educational initiative of Maximo Palomar; the experience formatted Larramendi reinforcing his penchant for social issues and for cultural rather than political dimension of Traditionalism.

Following demise of Academia in the mid-1940s there were no official or semi-official Carlist structure in Madrid; internal political and dynastical fragmentation contributed to crisis of the movement. During that period Larramendi, influenced by Elías de Tejada and own father, tended to favor Dom Duarte and the Braganzas as most legitimate candidates to the throne, though in the early 1950s he was already converted to supporter of the Borbón-Parmas. Following a brief and moderately successful episode of launching in 1951 an own publishing house, Traditionalist-flavored Editorial Cálamo, in the early 1950s he became known in the movement as a young, vehemently anti-Francoist and dynastically loyal militant. He was counted among intransigent followers of the official Carlist leader Manuel Fal Conde, so-called Falcondistas, though did not rise to top layers of the movement. During the first royal presentation of the claimant Don Javier in Barcelona in 1952 he was not listed among those attending, though certainly position of his father, at that time among those co-engineering launch of Don Javier's campaign, helped him enter Carlist ruling circles of the era.

It seems that soon Larramendi's anti-Francoism exceeded that of Fal; in the mid-1950s he was considered member of "duros" or "guipúzcoanos", an internal faction grumbling at official party line as yielding versus Franco; others consider him member of the "intellectuals" faction, also opposed to the "integrist" group of Fal. As internal crisis climaxed, in the mid-1950s Fal was forced into resignation and Vasco-Navarros suggested that Larramendi be appointed to Secretariado Político, a freshly created body supposed to assist a new leader, José María Valiente. The plan was to push hard with the royal claim of Don Javier, but it backfired; it turned out that the new party executive was dominated by supporters of replacing intransigence with a collaborationist offer to Franco. When the new Secretariat addressed Falange with proposal of a joint action, Larramendi resigned. His career in the executive terminated after just few months.

Late politics: in the back seat

Larramendi remained active in the Carlist structures and took part in their public initiatives. During the 1957 annual Carlist Montejurra gathering he was among party pundits when they introduced an heir to the throne, Don Carlos Hugo. In fact he remained somewhat skeptical and anxious that the prince might be tempted to pursue a collaborationist line; the same year Larramendi was vital fomenting dissent in the Madrid AET organization, which deposed its leader and key Don Carlos Hugo promoter, Ramón Massó, as the one who compromised Traditionalist identity and advocated rapprochement with the regime.

In the late 1950s Larramendi was engaged in works of Carlist structures in Madrid; it implied collaboration with personal entourage of the prince, who set his headquarters in the capital. Differences of opinion continued and gave rise to two factions, pro-collaborationists and anti-collaborationists; Massó, leader of the former and himself former Larramendi's acquaintance from the Academia years, considered him representative of "mas pura ortodoxia tradicionalista". In the early 1960s Larramendi kept frequenting Montejurra every year, though with his sons rather than among the official executive. By the mid-1960s his engagement in party life was already very loose, especially after in 1963 his friends, Gambra and Elías, broke with Comunión as it was assuming an increasingly unorthodox stance. When the conflict climaxed in the late 1960s Larramendi was a witness rather than a participant. As Hugocarlistas traded their pro-Falangist penchant for belligerent anti-Francoism his earlier concerns faded away, replaced with anxiety about radically Marxist turn of the prince. What did not change was his loyalty to the dynasty; shortly before Don Javier's expulsion in 1969 Larramendi hosted his king in the own Madrid Villa Covadonga residence.

In 1970, when the Hugocarlista domination was not yet complete, the Madrid party branch nominated Larramendi to take part in Arbonne gathering, styled as a would-be platform for compromise between the Progressists and the Traditionalists. Considered representative of the Traditionalists but not involved in internal party struggle he seemed an in-between delegate and indeed adopted a conciliatory stand. In what sounded like a distant echo of pro-social writings of his father, Larramendi declared that if the party was to embrace socialist ideas its members should act instead of talking, and that he would start with himself. The point was about his position of a corporate business leader, but most of those present took it for support of Don Carlos Hugo. They were soon proved wrong; Larramendi stayed out of the newly emergent Partido Carlista and in 1975 addressed his king, Don Javier, with a joint letter, in ultimative terms demanding confirmation of Traditionalist principles. As the claimant abdicated in favor of his son the Traditionalists addressed Don Carlos Hugo with another letter; Larramendi was among the signatories neither of this nor of the following document, marking ultimate break with the new claimant. In the mid-1970 he loosely neared Sixtinos, but refrained from political activity after the death of Franco.

MAPFRE: from nearly bankrupt to market leader

Following months spent in London Larramendi worked in Dirección de Seguros until 1952, when he joined Royal Insurance Company to head its Madrid office; following disagreement with its managers and a few-month spell back at Dirección in 1955, the same year he joined MAPFRE, a mid-size private insurance mutual. At the time the company was at the verge of bankruptcy; as director general Larramendi was tasked with introducing a sanitation program. He re-negotiated a long-term debt repayment period with Consejo General de Colegios de Farmacéuticos de España, closed some branches and streamlined ongoing operations, resulting in Mutualidad getting out of red and returning to profit in the late 1950s. At the turn of the decades Larramendi was already in position to design new growth schemes.

Following introduction of obligatory health insurance Larramendi set up MAPFRE Mutua Patronal de Accidentes de Trabajo. In the early 1960s he pushed for developing a financial arm, intended to merge insurance with credit as a combined offer to car buyers; the plan was accomplished in 1962 by taking over Central de Obras y Crédito and proved successful at the rapidly growing Spanish car market. Another rewarding strategic move was creating Muinsa, an investment trust company intended to find ways around restrictive regulations limiting investment activity of insurance companies. Other specialized ITC companies, Muinsa Dos, Progesa and Mapinco, soon followed, and in the late 1960s the mutual started to re-format some of its structures into joint-stock organizations.

In 1969 Larramendi drafted first major corporate shakeup, which materialized in 1970. Mutual, targeting mostly the transport market, controlled Gama or MAPFRE Group, which in turn oversaw MAPFRE Industrial and MAPFRE Vida, specializing in business and consumer sectors. The scheme worked allowing sharing common back-office services while retaining autonomy and accountability of diversified and dedicated structures; with car sales booming, in the early 1970s the group became market leader on the car insurance market. Larramendi's position as CEO was so strong that when in conflict with chairman of the board, it was rather the latter who resigned in 1972; his own formal role changed in 1975 from director general to consejero delegado, remaining key and dominating corporate personality.

The mid-1970s were a crisis period in world economy, affecting Spain and MAPFRE as well. Larramendi responded with another reorganization in 1978, based on creation of Corporación MAPFRE as a holding structure and reducing stakes in controlled companies, fully moved to the joint-stock formula. The scheme proved transitional and in 1983 was followed by launch of Sistema MAPFRE 85, Mutual at its centre and by means of Corporación controlling all daughter companies, now specializing in 3 areas: transport, various risks and life & re-insurance. Once the crisis period faded away the group retained dynamics; in 1983 MAPFRE became market leader on the Spanish insurance market.

MAPFRE: domestic and international expansion

Already in 1969 Larramendi ensured the decision to commence expansion beyond Spain; though various directions were considered, from the onset he had his sights set on Latin America. In the early 1970s the company, by means of Editorial MAPFRE, embarked on public relations campaign, while Larramendi used to tour the continent himself; he made sure that Argentina was the most promising market and Colombia was the "mas españolista" country. In the late 1970s the company was looking for the most appropriate expansion formula; on the one hand, in 1976 it set up MAPFRE Internacional and directly entered many South American markets, on the other, it formed re-insurance conglomerates with Belgian and Dutch companies. None of that really worked; the most successful strategy was taking over local entities and using re-insurance as a ram to enter local markets; following acquisitions of Seguros Caribe (Colombia), Aconcagua (Argentina) and other companies, in the late 1980s MAPFRE became a major player on the continent. Also swift response to the 1985 Mexico earthquake earned the group prestige and recognition. In 1998 the company became re-insurance market leader in Latin America and the first among foreign companies in general. On the Latin American market MAPFRE engaged in 10 companies before 1990 and 22 after that date.

During Larramendi's tenure MAPFRE failed to develop more than testimonial business in Europe. Following market simulations it was agreed that though a key player in Spain, the company was not in position to engage in full scale competition with larger German, Dutch or French conglomerates in the EEC, especially that earlier investment in Progress, a Sicily-focused company intended as starter for the Italian expansion, turned out to be a failure. At some stage MAPFRE considered entering Japan, but the Far-East plans were finally scaled down to businesses in Hong Kong and Macau.

In 1985 Larramendi re-formatted his role from chief executive to presidente de la comisión de control institucional, but it was himself who remained behind the steering wheel. In the late 1980s he co-designed another scheme, named Plan Sistema MAPFRE 92. Two key entities, Mutual MAPFRE and Corporación MAPFRE, remained at its core. The entire business was re-drawn in line with the logic gaining popularity among corporative moguls of the era and designed after the Japanese zaibatsu model; its key feature was turning multi-business conglomerates into loose federative schemes with huge autonomy of its components. In 1990 the company re-emphasized its banking arm by creating Banco MAPFRE, the nucleus of Crédito del Sistema MAPFRE. The same year, having reached the age of 70, Larramendi resigned from all corporate roles except in the international business, where he stepped down in 1995; he complied with the rules he created and introduced himself. He was leaving the company operating 1,648 branch offices, employing directly 4,500 people and indirectly further 12,000, with 500m ptas consolidated assets and annual proceeds of 200m ptas.

MAPFRE: corporate success factors

Larramendi is counted among the 100 most influential Spanish managers of the 20th century. When inquired about his success as a manager, Larramendi usually pointed to HR-related factors, principally the internal code of conduct he introduced, at that time unheard of in corporative business and responsible for emergence of a new breed of employees, called mafristas. The code was supposed to reflect moral values he adhered to, first of all mutual respect, transparency and integrity. He also emphasized the importance of delegating, de-centralised management and responsiveness to what he called an anarchist realm of individual initiatives and ideas, the model now firmly incorporated in change management manuals as "emergent change" and opposed to "planned change".

Indeed, business historians agree that Larramendi's approach to human factor was key; importing mechanisms he learnt in Britain and the US, he introduced modern HR management with career paths, training plans, supervision, mentoring and other techniques, apart from preference for recruiting university graduates. That was part of his general mindset, default in case of present-day managers though absent at that time, focused at holistic realm of stakeholders – employees, owners, customers, suppliers, everyone affected – instead of merely shareholders. It is also confirmed that decentralized management with regional direcciones generales instead of delegados provinciales and full managerial accountability with little cross-subsidizing contributed to internal efficiency of operations. He is credited for developing a business model dubbed "specialized diversification", allowing customer focus, reduced back-office and increased economics of scale by taking advantage of numerous shared services. 

Larramendi is also deemed responsible for introducing to Spain a number of features specific for insurance and financial markets, be it new products like travel assistance plans for motorists or home assistance programs for home owners, new corporative techniques like risk management, broadening scope of activities to entirely new areas and a new strategic customer interface concept of "one-stop financial shopping". His focus on accessible and accurate information, bordering obsession, led to leadership in terms of technology; MAPFRE was the second company in Spain to introduce telex and among the first ones to embrace broad-scale digital data storage techniques.

MAPFRE success in Latin America is deemed perfect illustration of John Duning's "eclectic paradigm" theory, with ownership advantages, location advantages and internalization advantages all combined and exploited to the utmost. Another concept referred to is Richard Caves' "intangible assets theory"; in case of Larramendi it would be selection of risks (with focus on re-insurance, direct insurance and assistance), HR management and especially banking on cultural proximity, which allowed MAPFRE to outpace other, especially US-based competitors. He was acknowledged with a number of national and international corporate honors, e.g. Golden Medal of International Insurance Seminar Founder's Award (1986) and Medalla de Oro del Seguro Español (1987).

Cultural patronage

In line with his concept of corporative social responsibility already in the 1970s Larramendi engaged in non-profit initiatives; in 1975 he set up Fundación MAPFRE, intended to propagate safety at work and support accident recovery schemes; it was followed by Fundación Cultural MAPFRE Vida (1988), Fundación MAPFRE América (1988), Fundación MAPFRE Estudios (1989), Fundación MAPFRE Medicina (1989) and Fundación MAPFRE Guanarteme. It was when he retired that Larramendi threw himself into their activities, dedicating most effort to Fundación América. Its key initiative was launching Colecciones Mapfre 1492, a set of 19 series, each with multitude of publications and each dedicated to specific subject, e.g. indigenous languages or urban centers; each volume published was presented to a number of institutions in Latin American countries and elsewhere. Another initiative was re-edition of historical documents and co-sponsoring international americanist conferences, colloquies and programs, often in collaboration with UNESCO.

In the 1990s Larramendi co-founded and was the moving spirit behind Fundación Histórica Tavera, operating an institute of the same name and dedicated to protection of bibliographic and documentary patrimony of Spain, Portugal and Iberoamerica. The foundation embarked mostly on a number of digitalization projects, programs supporting bibliographical and referential initiatives, cataloging and co-operation in archival efforts targeting various civil and ecclesiastic institutions. Instituto published also a few digital series under common title Clasicós Tavera, each one covering a single historical topic like Iberoamerica, regional histories, bibliographies etc., activity transferred further on to Centro de Referencias REFMAP and Centro de Publicaciones Digitales, later renamed to Digibis.

Another thread of Larramendi's patronage activity was related to Carlism. He contributed financially to a number of Carlism-flavored publishing initiatives, especially Aportes. In honor of his father in 1986 he set up Fundación Hernando de Larramendi, currently operating as Fundación Ignacio Larramendi; its declared mission is to promote "caridad en las relaciones sociales" in line with the Catholic teaching, to act as independent think-tank, to study history of Carlism and to support non-commercial scientific research. Most visible initiatives of the Foundation are related to dissemination of Carlist thought and promotion of Carlist studies. It keeps releasing digitalized collections of Traditionalist theorists, publishes mostly scholarly though at times also literary works within a Colección Luis Hernando de Larramendi series and awards Premio Internacional de Historia del Carlismo Luis Hernando de Larramendi, with the objective to "apoyar a los libros que aportan conocimientos objetivos para la verdad, no la verdad falsificada, no la verdad sectaria, sino la verdad a secas". The Foundation also keeps running a website with a number of digitalized works and press cuttings available.

The Spanish state acknowledged Larramendi's efforts of cultural patronage by awarding him a number of honors, most notably Encomienda de Isabel la Católica (1996) and Gran Cruz de la Orden del Mérito Civil (1998).

Author

Larramendi fathered 8 books and published some 50 articles, mostly in specialized reviews. Majority are related to business, topped by Manual básico de seguros (1982). Most readers, however, would find his works on society and politics more interesting.

Tres claves de la vida inglesa (1951) was result of Larramendi's spell in London. Formally discussing legal, commercial and insurance systems, the book was praise of the British social and state model; it was hailed as merger of efficient economic order and organization on the one hand, and traditional values and structures on the other. The British system was judged as balanced, especially compared to the French model, stemming from bureaucratic illusions as to state and its powers to build a new order. Fascination with British sense of continuity and intermediary institutions acting in-between state and society remained with Larramendi until the end of his life; Tres claves stands out as an anomaly in usually anti-British Carlist thought, lambasting Albion as a hotbed of Liberalism, plutocracy, freemasonry and greed.

In 1977 Larramendi published Anotaciones de sociopolítica independiente, intended as discussion of post-Francoist Spain. The work was a non-belligerent advance of social-Catholic vision. In practical terms it vaguely proposed a hybrid regime with some regulatory mechanisms working as checks-and-balances versus politics decided by universal suffrage, thought most Francoist institutions were deemed useless. Francoism in general was acknowledged with mixed feelings as a system which ensured peace and socio-economic transformation, but was plagued by corruption and vengeance. Greatly in favor of Spanish integration within the West European structures, it also proposed "la gran Europa de raza blanca y herencia cristiana" as political entity for the 21s century. A thread repeatedly coming back was anxiety about a would-be Communist penetration of Spain, though the book acknowledged Socialism in its "non-maximalist" incarnations as an option to be discussed.

In 1992 Larramendi published Utopía de la Nueva América, result of his American fascinations; the key thesis advanced was that Iberoamérica and Angloamérica would merge to create a new cultural entity. In the mid-1990s he commenced his written opus magnum, a series of 5 volumes intended as a response to perceived threats of global imbalance, disintegration of Europe and fragmentation of Spain; it was supposed to advance a proposal of "reforma operativa del estado español" though also to address general problems. The series was finally down to 3 books, almost 750 pages in total: Crisis de sociedad: reflexiones para el siglo XXI (1995), Panorama para una reforma del estado (1996) and Bienestar solidario (1998). All were holistic and on the other hand fairly detailed attempts to re-define key public institutions in line with the vision of Christian solidarity; Crisis tended to be more historical and theoretical, Panorama discussed key state operation areas, while Bienestar focused on key public structures, mostly related to education, labor and insurance.

The final and possibly most popular book was Así se hizo MAPFRE (2000), discussing history of the company against fairly wide background of personal life and general business and social environment.

See also
 Carlism
 Mapfre
 Hispanidad
 Luis Hernando de Larramendi y Ruiz

Footnotes

Further reading
 Pablo Larraz Andía, Víctor Sierra-Sesúmaga Ariznabarreta, Requetés: de las trincheras al olvido, Madrid 2011, 
 Leonardo Caruana de las Cagigas, The Insurance Demutualization Process Develops in Spain with Mapfre, [in:] Robin Pearson, Takau Yoneyama, Corporate Forms and Organisational Choice in International Insurance, Oxford 2015, pp. 284–299
 Leonardo Caruana de las Cagigas, José Luis García Ruiz, La internacionalización del seguro español: el caso de MAPFRE, 1969–2001, [in:] Información Comercial Española 849 (2009), pp. 143–157
 Jerónia Pons Pons, Ignacio Hernando de Larramendi, [in:] Eugenio Torres (ed.), Los 100 empresarios españoles del siglo XX, Madrid 2000, pp. 493–497
 Mecenazgo cultural de Ignacio Hernando de Larramendi y Montiano. Crónica y testimonios, Madrid 2002,

External links
 biography on Fundacion Larramendi site (95% copied from this WP entry)
 MAPFRE corporative web page
 Fundacion MAPFRE web page
 Por Dios y por España; contemporary Carlist propaganda

1921 births
2001 deaths
Carlists
Francoist Spain
Spanish anti-communists
20th-century Spanish businesspeople
Spanish business executives
20th-century Spanish historians
Roman Catholic writers
Spanish male writers
20th-century Spanish lawyers
Spanish people of the Spanish Civil War (National faction)
Spanish military personnel of the Spanish Civil War (National faction)
Spanish monarchists
Spanish politicians
Spanish Roman Catholics
Spanish people of Basque descent
Politicians from Madrid